Borealis is a Canadian documentary film, directed by Kevin McMahon and released in 2020. The film is a portrait of the delicate ecosystem of the Canadian boreal forest, highlighting the environmental threats that are damaging it.

The film had been slated to premiere at the 2020 Hot Docs Canadian International Documentary Festival, but after the festival was postponed in light of the COVID-19 pandemic in Canada, it was not one of the films screened when the festival proceeded virtually in May. The film instead premiered in December 2020 in a television broadcast on TVOntario.

Awards

References

External links
 

2020 films
2020 documentary films
Canadian documentary television films
Canadian Screen Award-winning films
National Film Board of Canada documentaries
Documentary films about forests and trees
2020s English-language films
2020s Canadian films